Kiar gali latif khan or Kiargali  is a village in Battagram District in Pakistan's Khyber Pakhtunkhwa province. It is part of Gijbori Union Council and is located about three kilometres from the district headquarters Battagram along the Shahrah-e-Resham (Karakoram Highway) or silk route. There is only one khel shampori. The people of Kiargali Latif Khan are mostly well educated.

See also
Battagram
Khyber Pakhtunkhwa

References

External links
 "NRC PAKISTAN EARTHQUAKE SITUATION REPORT – WEEK ENDING 5TH FEB 2006" - Norwegian Refugee Council

Battagram District